Frank Mitchell Winters (born January 23, 1964) is a former American football center in the National Football League for the Cleveland Browns, New York Giants, Kansas City Chiefs, and the Green Bay Packers.

Early life
Frank Mitchell Winters was born in Hoboken, New Jersey. He lived in Union City, and played football at Emerson High School.

Career
Winters played American football at Western Illinois University and was drafted in the tenth round of the 1987 NFL Draft.

Winters was the Packers' starting center serving for eight straight seasons (1993–2000).  He played in the Pro Bowl and also earned USA Today All-Pro honors in 1999. His nickname was "Frankie Baggadonuts" or "Old Bag of Donuts".

On July 18, 2008, Winters was inducted into the Green Bay Packers Hall of Fame.  His ceremony was marked by heightened media interest because quarterback Brett Favre gave the induction speech amidst the developing saga regarding Favre's status with the Packers.

On May 20, 2009, Winters got an internship with the Indianapolis Colts.

He has part ownership in a popular Missouri bar and grill, Frankie & Johnny's.

References

1964 births
Living people
Sportspeople from Hoboken, New Jersey
Sportspeople from Union City, New Jersey
American football centers
American football offensive guards
Western Illinois Leathernecks football players
Cleveland Browns players
New York Giants players
Players of American football from New Jersey
Kansas City Chiefs players
Green Bay Packers players
National Conference Pro Bowl players